(S)-Tetrahydroberberine oxidase (EC 1.3.3.8) is an enzyme that catalyzes the final transformation in the biosynthesis of berberine, a quaternary benzylisoquinoline alkaloid of the protoberberine structural subgroup. This reaction pathway catalyzes the four-electron oxidation of (S)-tetrahydroberberine (also known as (S)-canadine) in the presence of oxygen to produce berberine and hydrogen peroxide as products.

(S)-Tetrahydroberberine + 2 O2  ⇌   Berberine + 2 H2O2

This enzyme belongs to the family known as oxidoreductases, in this instance the CH-CH moiety acts as the electron donor with oxygen acting as the electron acceptor. The systematic name of this enzyme is (S)-tetrahydroberberine:oxygen oxidoreductase; but it is also known as (S)-THB oxidase, tetrahydroberberine oxidase, and decreasingly, as (S)-tetrahydroprotoberberine oxidase.

References

EC 1.3.3
Enzymes of unknown structure